Juan Ricardo Ojeda, better known as T.J. Storm, is an American actor, stuntman, dancer, and martial artist. He is best known for his role as Bayu in Conan the Adventurer and for his motion capture performances in Tron: Legacy, Captain America: Civil War, Deadpool, and as Godzilla in the MonsterVerse series.

Early life
Storm was born Juan Ricardo Ojeda, the son of a Puerto Rican mother and African-American father in Fort Wayne, Indiana. He was put up for adoption and raised in Honolulu,  Hawaii by a Caucasian mother of Native American descent and Mexican-American father. As a child, his adoptive mother wanted to keep him occupied, so he took up dancing and martial arts as a way to balance himself. He went on to study Arashi-Ryu Karate, Taekwondo, Ninjutsu, Brazilian Jiu-Jitsu, and Northern Shaolin, and mastered forms of hip hop dancing and breakdancing. The surname "Storm" supposedly originated from a nickname and is related to one of the karate styles he trained in.

Career
Storm has starred in several major projects including Conan the Adventurer, Punisher: War Zone, Green Lantern, Avatar, Jack the Giant Slayer, and The Martial Arts Kid. He has also provided voice acting and motion capture for a variety of video games.

Filmography

References

External links

Living people
African-American male actors
American male film actors
American male television actors
American male video game actors
American male voice actors
American martial artists
American people of Puerto Rican descent
American stunt performers
Male motion capture actors
20th-century American male actors
21st-century American male actors
Year of birth missing (living people)
20th-century African-American people
21st-century African-American people